National Library of Somaliland or Silanyo National Library is the national library of Somaliland. It is located in Hargeisa, the capital of Somaliland, it is the first and largest national library in Somaliland.

Overview
Founded in 2017 and named after former president of Somaliland Ahmed Mohamed Mohamoud

See also 
 List of national and state libraries
 Berbera Public Library
 Legal deposit
 National library

References

ISBN agencies
Government of Somaliland
Somaliland
World Digital Library partners
Deposit libraries
Libraries in Somaliland